Catherine Seymour may refer to: 
Catherine Seymour, born Catherine Parr, sixth wife of Henry VIII of England
Catherine Seymour, born Lady Catherine Grey (1540–1568), sister of Lady Jane Grey, claimant to the throne of England
Catherine Seymour, born Catherine Filliol, wife of Edward Seymour, 1st Duke of Somerset